RUOK? is a 2002 album by the British industrial techno group Meat Beat Manifesto. Some editions included the mini Enhanced CD Free Piece Suite. The album was recorded at Tape Lab Studios in California and was mastered at The Exchange in London. It features the rare EMS Synthi 100 synthesizer.

"Horn of Jericho" was re-released as "Matron" on Battersea Shield (EP).

Track listing
"Yüri" - 5:38
"Spinning Round" - 5:26
"Horn of Jericho" - 7:10
"What Does It All Mean?" - 5:20
"No Words Necessary" - 4:41
"Intermission" - 1:07
"Supersoul" - 5:35
"Handkerchief Head" - 6:35
"No Echo in Space" - 6:26
"Dynamite Fresh" - 5:41
"Retrograde" - 4:57
"Happiness Supreme" - 2:39

LP version (QS140) has only eight tracks with different order: 1; 2; 4; 8; 3; 7; 11; 9

References

Meat Beat Manifesto albums
2002 albums
Albums produced by Jack Dangers